In the music industry, a collection of musical compositions is cataloged into a music catalog. The owner owns the copyrights of the cataloged compositions.

See also

 Catalogues of classical compositions
 Commission (art)
 History of music publishing
 Music library
 Music publisher
 Patronage
 Thematic catalogue
 Repertoire

References

Recorded music
Music industry
Music publishing
Copyright law
 
Musical terminology